Vladislavs Sorokins (born 10 May 1997) is a Latvian footballer who plays as a left-back for RFS and the Latvia national team.

Career
Sorokins made his international debut for Latvia on 11 November 2020 in a friendly match against San Marino.

Career statistics

International

References

External links
 Vladislavs Sorokins at LFF.lv
 
 

1997 births
Living people
Footballers from Riga
Latvian footballers
Latvia youth international footballers
Latvia under-21 international footballers
Latvia international footballers
Association football fullbacks
Skonto FC players
FK Jelgava players
FK RFS players
Latvian Higher League players